Claude Boivin (born March 1, 1970) is a Canadian former professional ice hockey player. He played in the National Hockey League (NHL) with the Philadelphia Flyers and Ottawa Senators.

Biography
As a youth, Boivin played in the 1983 Quebec International Pee-Wee Hockey Tournament with a minor ice hockey team from Riverains in Quebec City. He later played junior ice hockey with the Drummondville Voltigeurs in the Quebec Major Junior Hockey League. Boivin was drafted 14th overall by the Philadelphia Flyers in the 1988 NHL Entry Draft, and played for the Flyers and Ottawa Senators.

Career statistics

References

External links
 

1970 births
Living people
Canadian ice hockey left wingers
Drummondville Voltigeurs players
French Quebecers
Grand Rapids Griffins (IHL) players
Hershey Bears players
Ice hockey people from Quebec City
Laval Titan players
National Hockey League first-round draft picks
Ottawa Senators players
People from Sainte-Foy, Quebec City
Philadelphia Flyers draft picks
Philadelphia Flyers players
Prince Edward Island Senators players